The 1946 Maine Black Bears football team was an American football team that represented the University of Maine as a member of the Maine Intercollegiate Athletic Conference (MIAC) and the Yankee Conference during the 1946 college football season. In its second season under head coach George E. Allen, the team compiled a 2–5 record (2–1 against MIAC opponents, 0–3 against Yankee Conference opponents) and finished in second place in the MIAC and last place in the Yankee Conference. Richard Burrill was the team captain. The team played its home games at Alumni Field in Orono, Maine.

Schedule

References

Maine
Maine
Maine Black Bears football seasons
Maine Black Bears football